The Fresno State Bulldogs softball program is a college softball team that represents the California State University, Fresno in the Mountain West Conference in the National Collegiate Athletic Association. The team has had four head coaches since it started playing organized softball in the 1978 season.

Key

Coaches

Notes

References

Lists of college softball head coaches in the United States

Fresno State Bulldogs softball coaches